2014 African Youth Games in Gaborone was held between 28 and 31 May at the Botswana National Stadium. The competition served as the qualification for the 2014 Summer Youth Olympics which took place in August in Nanjing, China.

Medal summary

Medal table

Boys events

Girls events

References 

2014 African Youth Games